Kai Rüder (born 27 August 1971) is a German former equestrian. He competed in the individual eventing at the 2000 Summer Olympics.

References

External links
 

1971 births
Living people
German male equestrians
Olympic equestrians of Germany
Equestrians at the 2000 Summer Olympics
People from Fehmarn
Sportspeople from Schleswig-Holstein